Chusquea albilanata is a species of Chusquea bamboo.

Distribution
Chusquea albilanata endemic to Colombia and Ecuador in South America.

References

albilanata
Flora of Colombia
Flora of Ecuador